In My Time is an album by the Gerald Wilson Orchestra recorded in 2005 and released on the Mack Avenue label.

Reception

AllMusic rated the album with 4½ stars; in his review, Scott Yanow noted: "it is the enthusiastic arranger/bandleader who takes honors with his consistently inventive writing and (one imagines) enthusiastic conducting. Highly recommended". In JazzTimes Harvey Siders wrote: "while his concerted writing may be dense, it also swings fluidly. ...this is remarkably youthful vim and vigor for an 87-year-old". On All About Jazz Marcia Hillman noted: "The octogenerian leader pays no attention to the numbers in his age. The music he writes, arranges and conducts is fresh and vital. This is big band music at its best, full of energy and excitement". The Penguin Guide to Jazz Recordings describe the album as having “power directed by invention and softened by sheer musicality.”

Track listing 
All compositions by Gerald Wilson except where noted.
 "Sax Chase" - 10:22
 "The Diminished Triangle: Dorian" - 7:27
 "The Diminished Triangle: Ray's Vision at the U" - 4:25
 "The Diminished Triangle: Blues for Manhattan" - 8:47
 "Lomelin" - 7:45
 "A.E.N." - 10:26
 "Musette" - 5:48
 "So What" (Miles Davis) - 11:09
 "Love for Sale" (Cole Porter) - 5:05 	
 "Jeri" - 3:54

Personnel 
Gerald Wilson - arranger, conductor
Jon Faddis, Eddie Henderson, Sean Jones (tracks 2–5, 8 & 9), Jimmy Owens, Jeremy Pelt (tracks 1, 6, 7 & 10), Mike Rodriguez - trumpet
Luis Bonilla, Benny Powell, Dennis Wilson - trombone
Douglas Purviance - bass trombone
Jerry Dodgion - alto saxophone, soprano saxophone, flute
Steve Wilson - alto saxophone, flute
Dustin Cicero - alto saxophone
Ron Blake - tenor saxophone, flute
Kamasi Washington - tenor saxophone
Gary Smulyan - baritone saxophone
Renee Rosnes - piano
Russell Malone - guitar 
Peter Washington - bass 
Lewis Nash - drums

References 

Gerald Wilson albums
2005 albums
Mack Avenue Records albums
Albums arranged by Gerald Wilson
Albums conducted by Gerald Wilson